The 2015–16 Michigan State Spartans women's basketball team will represent Michigan State University during the 2015–16 NCAA Division I women's basketball season. The Spartans, led by ninth year head coach Suzy Merchant, play their home games at the Breslin Center and were members of the Big Ten Conference. They finished with a record of 25–9, 13–5 in Big Ten play to finish in third place. They advanced to the championship game of the Big Ten women's tournament where they lost to Maryland. They received an at-large bid to the NCAA women's tournament where they defeated Belmont in the first round before losing to Mississippi State in the second round.

Roster

Schedule

|-
!colspan=9 style="background:#18453b; color:#FFFFFF;"| Exhibition

|-
!colspan=9 style="background:#18453b; color:#FFFFFF;"| Non-conference regular season

|-
!colspan=9 style="background:#18453b; color:#FFFFFF;"| Big Ten regular season

|-
!colspan=9 style="text-align: center; background:#18453b"|Big Ten Women's Tournament

|-
!colspan=9 style="text-align: center; background:#18453b"|NCAA Women's Tournament

Rankings

See also
 2015–16 Michigan State Spartans men's basketball team

References

Michigan State Spartans women's basketball seasons
Michigan State
Michigan State